A mattress is a soft, cushioned pad on which a person can lie and sleep.

Mattress may also refer to:

 Mattress (rocket), a multiple rocket launcher during World War II
 "Mattress" (Glee), an episode
 "The Mattress" (Brooklyn Nine-Nine), an episode

See also
 Mattress Performance (Carry That Weight)